Bartl Brötzner (13 February 1928 – 12 September 2015) was an Austrian wrestler. He competed at the 1952 Summer Olympics, the 1956 Summer Olympics and the 1960 Summer Olympics.

References

1928 births
2015 deaths
Austrian male sport wrestlers
Olympic wrestlers of Austria
Wrestlers at the 1952 Summer Olympics
Wrestlers at the 1956 Summer Olympics
Wrestlers at the 1960 Summer Olympics
Sportspeople from Salzburg